Afemo Omilami (born December 13, 1950) is an American actor.

Early life
Omilami was born in Petersburg, Virginia on December 13, 1950.
Afemo has not made any public reference to his paternal background, however his name has ties to the Yoruba community in Nigeria.

Career
He has appeared in many films such as Trading Places  (1983), Glory (1989), The Firm (1993), Gordy (1995), Remember the Titans (2000), Ray (2004),  Hounddog (2007), The Blind Side (2009), and Terminator Genisys (2015).  He is perhaps best known for his role as the Drill Sergeant in Forrest Gump (1994). He had a recurring role as the streetwise Jimmy Dawes in In the Heat of the Night from 1989 to 1993. He was nominated for a 2013 NAACP Image Award in the category "Actor in a Television Movie, Mini-Series or Dramatic Special" for his performance in Lifetime's Steel Magnolias as Drum Eatenton.

He also appeared in guest roles in television series Miami Vice, Fortune Hunter, New York News, The Shield, Criminal Minds: Beyond Borders and Raising Dion.

Personal life
He married his wife Elisabeth Omilami on September 11, 1985. She is an actress, minister, and a civil rights leader.  They have two children: son Awodele and daughter Juanita.

His longtime friend was actor Thomas Jefferson Byrd. After Byrd was killed, Omilami described Byrd as a "devoted father and husband and a master of his craft".

Filmography

Film/Movie

Television

References

External links
 

1950 births
Living people
American people of Nigerian descent
American male film actors
African-American male actors
Male actors from Virginia
20th-century American male actors
21st-century American male actors
American male television actors
People from Petersburg, Virginia
20th-century African-American people
21st-century African-American people